Solalinden is a small village south-east of Munich, Germany. The village is a part of Putzbrunn Gemeinde, i.e. municipality.

Villages in Bavaria